The 2031 FIFA Women's World Cup is scheduled to be the eleventh edition of the FIFA Women's World Cup, the quadrennial international women's association football championship contested by the national teams that represent the member associations of FIFA. The tournament will involve 32 national teams, including that of the host nation to be decided in 2025.

Host selection
The host nation for the 2031 Women's World Cup is scheduled to be decided by the FIFA Congress in the second quarter of 2025, a year after the host selection for the 2027 edition, with bid regulations for approval in the second quarter of 2024.

Interested bids

China
In October 2022, the Chinese Football Association and the nation's sports ministry announced a new women's football program that would include a bid to host the 2031 FIFA Women's World Cup. The country previously won the rights to host the 2003 edition, which was instead hosted by the United States due to the SARS epidemic; the 2007 edition was automatically awarded to China by FIFA as compensation.

References

External links

FIFA Women's World Cup tournaments
FIFA Women's World Cup, 2031
FIFA
FIFA